(23 February 1951 – 26 December 2010) was a Japanese film director and screenwriter who worked in pink film and mainstream cinema. He won the award for Best Director at the 6th Yokohama Film Festival for Mermaid Legend.

Life and career

Early career - Nikkatsu
Ikeda graduated from the literature department of Waseda University in 1974, but became involved in filmmaking while still a student. According to Ikeda, his entry into the film industry was accidental, the result of a drunken barroom bet. His first job was at a small independent production company, Ishihara Productions, but he later moved to the major studio Nikkatsu, which at the time produced only films of the Roman porno genre, big budget versions of the pink film. At both companies, he began working as an Assistant Director, whose duties could include anything from cleaning floors to shaving actresses at a time when it was illegal to show even the slightest hint of pubic hair in Japanese media. Ikeda continued as an Assistant Director at Nikkatsu throughout the 1970s in such films as Flower and Snake (1974), Wife to be Sacrificed (1974) and Noble Lady: Bound Vase (1977), all directed by Masaru Konuma.

Ikeda made his debut as a director at Nikkatsu with the 1980 film, Sukeban Mafia which the Weissers call "satirical, rousing, sexy and character-driven." Later in 1980, Ikeda directed his second Roman porno feature for Nikkatsu, Sex Hunter, which the studio considered too rough and vulgar. For "penance", Nikkatsu sent him to Okinawa and told him to include some romance for his next film, Blue Lagoon: A Summer Experience, which had a standard boy-girl plot. Ikeda's last project for Nikkatsu was the 1981 Angel Guts: Red Porno, the fourth film in the six part Angel Guts series. Ikeda was brought in at the last minute when the original director dropped out and had only a month to shoot the film. Ikeda had a dispute with actress Jun Izumi about a nude shot in the film and when Nikkatsu cut the scene, Ikeda left the company feeling that they had failed to support him.

Director's Company and Evil Dead Trap
After leaving Nikkatsu, Ikeda joined a number of other young directors in the Director's Company, a production company founded in 1982. Ikeda's first film with the Director's Company was the 1984 Mermaid Legend which is considered by many to be his finest work and which garnered a Best Director award for Ikeda at the 1985 Yokohama Film Festival. A year later, Ikeda made Scent of a Spell, also for the Director's Company, a mystery about a newspaperman who saves a girl from suicide but discovers that she may not be as innocent as she seems. The screenplay was by Takashi Ishii who had also written the scripts for the Angel Guts series while he and Ikeda were together at Nikkatsu.

Ishii also penned the script for Ikeda's 1988 Evil Dead Trap, called Japan's first "splatter movie", and credited with being the first Japanese modern horror film. Although usually said to have been influenced by Sam Raimi’s The Evil Dead and the work of Dario Argento, Ikeda claimed in an interview never to have seen their films, hating horror so much that he never even watched Evil Dead Trap. He did, however, attend a showing of the film in Los Angeles when it was released for American audiences in 1999. The film was successful enough to spawn a sequel directed by Izo Hashimoto. Ikeda returned to direct Evil Dead Trap 3: Broken Love Killer (1993), again written by Ishii, but only made a sequel in name outside of Japan.

Later career and death
Through the 1990s, Ikeda did little work in theatrical films, most of his output being V-Cinema action and erotic films, including two entries in Toei Video's "XX: Beautiful" series based on the books of Arimasa Osawa, XX: Beautiful Beast (1995), the story of a Chinese hitwoman, and XX: Beautiful Prey (1996), about a female serial killer. His 1997 theatrical film The Key has become known as the first Japanese film to show full frontal female nudity after the rules against depicting pubic hair were relaxed. After a lapse of some years, Ikeda returned to theatrical films with the 2001 two-part horror movie Campus Ghost Stories (aka Shadow of the Wraith) starring sisters Hitomi Miwa and Asumi Miwa. He continued with the 2004 film The Man Behind the Scissors, which critic Jasper Sharp found a "quirky and perplexing police procedural" about a series of scissor murders. Ikeda's last film, Aki Fukaki (2008), a departure from his usual genre films, was a serious drama based on the works of Sakunosuke Oda and starred Norito Yashima and Eriko Sato.

It had been reported that Ikeda was fighting depression in his later years and a body found floating in the sea near Shima in the Mie Prefecture on December 26, 2010 was identified as his in late January 2011. His death may have been from an accidental fall or suicide but Ikeda had expressed a wish to die in the Shima area.

Filmography

Theatrical films - Director
  (Mar. 1980, Nikkatsu)
  (Oct. 1980, Nikkatsu)
  (July 1981, Nikkatsu)
  (Dec. 1981, Nikkatsu)
  (April 1984, Director's Company / ATG)
  (May 1984, Toei Central Films)
  (Dec. 1985, Director's Company)
  (May 1988, JHV)
 Misty (Nov. 1991, Toho)
  (June 1992)
  (June 1993)
  (Oct. 1997, Toei)
  (June 2001)
  (2004)
  (Nov. 2008)

V-Cinema - Director
  (Mar. 1990)
  (Mar. 1990)
 ごきぶり商事痛快譚　愛の五億円ぶるーす (Feb. 1991)
  (May 1991)
 監禁逃亡　禁断の陵辱 (Jan. 1995)
  (Sept. 1995)
  (Jan. 1996)
 監禁逃亡　性奴隷 (June 1997)
  (May 1998)
 監禁逃亡　地獄に咲いた女 (May 1999)
 無頼　人斬り五郎 (Oct. 1999)
 暴力商売 (Apr. 2001)
 暴力商売２ (June 2001)
 暴力商売　金融餓狼伝 (Feb. 2002)
 暴力商売　金融餓狼伝２ (Apr. 2002)
  (Jan. 2003)
  (Mar. 2003)

Sources
 Ikeda, Toshiharu. (1998). Interviewed in Asian Cult Cinema, #18.
 
 
 Weisser, Thomas. (1998). "Asian Cult Cinema Report: Film, News and Gossip", in Asian Cult Cinema, #22, 1st Quarter, 1999, p. 4-6. (American premier of Evil Dead Trap)

References

1951 births
2010 deaths
Japanese film directors
Pink film directors
Japanese screenwriters
People from Yamagata Prefecture
Waseda University alumni